Mya Marie Harrison (born October 10, 1979), (stylized as Mýa), is an American singer, songwriter, actress and dancer. Born into a musical family, she studied ballet, jazz, and tap dance as a child. Initially, Mya began her career as a VJ and dance posse member on BET's Teen Summit. During her stint at BET, she developed an interest in music which led to independent deal from the guidance of CEO Haqq Islam.  Signed in 1996 to Interscope Records, she released her eponymous debut album in April 1998. A critical and commercial success, the album produced her first top ten single "It's All About Me". Subsequent singles, "Ghetto Supastar (That Is What You Are)" and "Take Me There", continued to raise her profile and attained chart success worldwide, with the former garnering her first Grammy nomination. Fear of Flying, her second album, was released in April 2000 and became a worldwide success, boosted by the success of its singles "Case of the Ex" and "Free". Harrison continued her rise to prominence in 2002 when she won her first Grammy Award in the category for Best Pop Collaboration with Vocals for her rendition of Labelle's 1975 hit "Lady Marmalade" along with Pink, Christina Aguilera and Lil' Kim, which topped the charts globally.

Taking a more active role in the production of her music, Harrison released her third studio album, the eccentric Moodring, in July 2003. The album produced the single "My Love Is Like...Wo" and was certified gold by the RIAA. Following a label change and a delay in her fourth studio album, Harrison went independent and recorded two exclusive albums for the Japanese music market, Sugar & Spice (2008) and K.I.S.S. (Keep It Sexy & Simple) (2011). In between recording those two albums, she launched her own independent record label Planet 9 and competed in Dancing with the Stars – season nine; finishing in second place.

As an independent artist, Harrison continues to regularly release music. Beginning in 2014, she released a trio of R&B-rooted EPs, With Love (2014), Sweet XVI (2014), and Love Elevation Suite (2015). In 2016, Harrison released her seventh album, the Grammy-nominated Smoove Jones. The follow-up, TKO (The Knock Out), arrived in April 2018 to commemorate the twentieth anniversary of her debut album.

In addition to a music career, Harrison crossed over into acting and made her feature-film debut in 1999's thriller In Too Deep starring LL Cool J and Omar Epps. She continued to appear in supporting roles in films such as Chicago (2002), Dirty Dancing: Havana Nights (2004), Shall We Dance? (2004), and Cursed (2005).

Harrison's contribution to music has earned her many accolades in the fields of pop and R&B music categories. In 2009, Billboard listed Mya as one of their Hot 100 Artists of the 2000s; placing her in the 97th position. As of October 2020, she has sold over 3.2 million albums in the U.S. and 7 million albums worldwide.

Early life
Mya Harrison, a native of Washington, D.C., is one of three children. Her father Sherman is a musician and singer, and her mother Theresa worked as an accountant. She grew up in suburban Washington D.C. with her two younger brothers Chaz and Nijel. Mya took violin lessons throughout her childhood, but dance was her primary after-school activity. She started ballet lessons in 1982 when she was only two and jazz and tap when she was four. Her tap-dancing skills afforded her an opportunity to study with one of the best-known tap dancers in the country, Savion Glover, when he came to Washington, D.C. for a workshop. Glover later chose Mya for a solo spot in a dance performance at the Kennedy Center.

When he realized that his daughter was serious about a career in music, Mya's father began shopping around with her demo tape, eventually catching the interest of University Music president and CEO Haqq Islam. After graduating from Eleanor Roosevelt High School in Greenbelt, Maryland at 16, Mya took a few classes at the University of Maryland, College Park, but her primary focus was on the recording studio.

Career

1996–1999: Debut with Mya
After signing with major label Interscope Records, Mya spent the next two years recording her debut studio album. Using his connections, Islam was able to hire an elite team of collaborators to work with her, including Missy Elliott, Babyface, Diane Warren, Dru Hill, Darryl Pearson and Silkk Tha Shocker, while the staff at Interscope had envisioned to market Mya as their main female R&B artist, competing with fellow teen singers Aaliyah, Brandy and Monica. Released in April 1998 to generally favorable reviews, Mya peaked at number 29 on the US Billboard 200 and sold 1.4 million copies domestically. It received a platinum certification by the Recording Industry Association of America (RIAA), denoting shipments to US retailers of over 1,000,000 units. In total, the album sold two million copies worldwide. Mya yielded three successful singles, including her debut single, "It's All About Me" featuring fellow R&B singer Sisqó, which became a top-ten hit on the US Billboard Hot 100, as well as "Movin' On" and "My First Night with You".

The album earned her several accolades, which included two Soul Train Music Award nominations for Best R&B/Soul or Rap New Artist and Best R&B/Soul Album – Female and a NAACP Image Award nomination for Outstanding New Artist. In addition to her solo work, Mya, along with Blackstreet, Blinky Blink, and Mase, was featured on "Take Me There" from the soundtrack of the animated feature film The Rugrats Movie (1998). It reached number one in the New Zealand Singles Chart and became a top twenty hit in several nations, including the United Kingdom, Ireland, the Netherlands, and United States. Harrison also appeared with rapper Ol' Dirty Bastard on Pras' single "Ghetto Supastar", recorded for his debut solo studio album, Ghetto Supastar (1998). A worldwide number-one hit, the song topped the charts in more than a dozen nations and earned Mya her first Grammy Award nomination in the Best Rap Performance by a Duo or Group category. "Ghetto Supastar" was also featured on the soundtrack for the political satire film Bulworth. In 1999, Mya made her acting debut in the crime thriller film In Too Deep, directed by Michael Rymer. In the film, she played a young woman named Loretta  starring opposite LL Cool J and Omar Epps. In Too Deep received generally mixed reviews, but managed to recoup its budget.

2000–2002: Fear of Flying and "Lady Marmalade"
Additionally in late 1999, Mya began production on an album that would eventually become Fear of Flying, which involved a variety of producers, including Rodney Jerkins, Swizz Beatz, Jimmy Jam & Terry Lewis, and Wyclef Jean. The title was partially inspired by Erica Jong's same-titled 1973 novel, which shared a lot of similarities toward female sexuality and development of second-wave feminism. Mya, who did some writing on her debut album, was heavily involved in the production of Fear of Flying, from writing and recording to producing, mixing, and mastering. Released in April 2000 to mixed reviews, Fear of Flying debuted at number 15 on the Billboard 200 with first week sales of 72,000 copies. Upon initial release, its first single "The Best of Me" featuring Jadakiss had underperformed on the charts and suffered from the dreaded sophomore slump. The album's second single, the confrontational "Case of the Ex", proved to be a different matter. "Case of the Ex" became Mya's international breakthrough hit, topping the Australian Singles Chart for two consecutive weeks,
while reaching number two and three in the US and the United Kingdom, respectively, and in turn, solidified Fear of Flying as a hit.

With the success of "Case of the Ex", Interscope re-released Fear of Flying in November 2000, with a revised track listing featuring two new songs, including the third single "Free". Fear of Flying earned Mya a Soul Train Music Award nomination for R&B/Soul Album – Female and a MOBO nomination for Best Album. A multiplatinum success, the album sold 1.2 million copies in the United States and eventually received a platinum certification by the Recording Industry Association of America. Subsequently, it earned gold certifications from Canadian Recording Industry Association and Australian Recording Industry Association.

In spring of 2001, Mya paid tribute to Janet Jackson at MTV Icon. She performed her own rendition of Jackson's classic hit "The Pleasure Principle". By mid 2001, she had already amassed an impressive nine Top 10 hits and sold more than six million albums worldwide. The same year, she was featured on the Atlantis: The Lost Empire soundtrack, performing the Diane Warren-penned pop ballad "Where the Dream Takes You". The song was featured during the closing credits of the animated feature. Her next music project, Mya collaborated with singers Christina Aguilera, Lil' Kim, and Pink on the remake of Labelle's 1975 hit "Lady Marmalade", which served as the first single from the Moulin Rouge! soundtrack. A worldwide success, it reached number one in over fifteen countries, including the United States, where it spent five consecutive weeks at the top of the Billboard Hot 100. At 2001 MTV Video Music Awards, "Lady Marmalade" was nominated for six awards and won two for Best Video from a Film and Video of the Year. In 2002, the quartet performed "Lady Marmalade" at the 44th Grammy Awards and won a Grammy for Best Pop Collaboration with Vocals.

After the release and success of Fear of Flying and "Lady Marmalade", Mya began to dabble into acting with a small supporting role in the musical film, Chicago (2002), based on the stage-musical of the same name. Directed by Rob Marshall, it grossed more than $306.8 million worldwide and was critically lauded, winning Mya several awards in the ensemble categories, including the Critics' Choice Movie Award and the Screen Actors Guild Award. In March 2003, Mya appeared on hip hop alternative group Jurassic 5's remix version of the song "Thin Line". Chosen as their second single and more R&B driven, "Thin Line" addressed the tension that often exists in platonic male-female relationships.

2003–2007: Moodring and Liberation
 In July 2003, Interscope released Mya's third studio album, Moodring. It sold more than 113,000 copies in its first week and peaked at number three on the US Billboard 200, surpassing Mya's previous effort first-week sales. The album displayed an array of different emotions exploring Mya's playful and sexual side. The bulk of Moodring was co-written and co-produced by Mya and influenced by different subjects and music stylings including pop rock, soul, hip hop, R&B, and quiet storm. The first single, the Missy Elliott-produced "My Love Is Like ... Wo" became a top twenty hit on the Billboard Hot 100, while its accompanying music video showcased a more sexy and risqué side of the singer. The second single, mid tempo track "Fallen", failed to duplicate the same success, but reached the top forty on Billboards Hot R&B/Hip-Hop Songs chart. Moodring stayed on the United States chart for eighteen non-consecutive weeks and went on to be certified gold, selling 589,000 copies to date.

In 2004, she had two small roles in the dance musical Dirty Dancing: Havana Nights and romantic comedy-drama film Shall We Dance?. In the films, she played a Latina lounge singer named Lola Martinez and the fiancée of a ballroom dancing student. While Dirty Dancing: Havana Nights, a re-imagining of the 1987 blockbuster Dirty Dancing, tanked at the box office, Shall We Dance?,  a remake of the 1996 Japanese film of the same name, became a box office hit, grossing $170,128,460 worldwide.  Subsequently, the same year, Mya began working on her fourth studio album. Originally conceived as a project called Control Freak, the album's first version was actually scheduled for a mid-2005 release, but was eventually shelved when Mya decided to leave her management and A&M Records in fall 2005. In 2005, she had a supporting role in Wes Craven's horror film Cursed, starring Christina Ricci and Joshua Jackson. In the film, Mya played a young victim by the name of Jenny Tate. Although Cursed tanked at the box office, it earned her a nomination in the Best Frightened Performance category at the 2005 MTV Movie Awards. Mya guest starred in season two of NCIS.

In 2006, she co-starred in the romantic comedy drama The Heart Specialist, written, produced and directed by Dennis Cooper, and starred Wood Harris, Zoe Saldana, and Brian J. White. Originally released under the title Ways of the Flesh, it initially premiered at the 2006 Boston Film Festival however had remain unreleased until 2011, when it was granted a limited theatrical release. The same year, she signed a recording contract with Universal Motown and resumed work on her next album, which she completed within a three-month period. Classified as "energetic [and] ghetto" with a less classic R&B edge, Mya renamed the project Liberation. In March 2007, the album's lead single "Lock U Down", a collaboration with Lil Wayne, was sent to radio. After its commercial failure, a second single entitled "Ridin'" was released, but it also underperformed. Due to budget cuts, the album suffered numerous pushbacks and in mid–2007, it accidentally leaked in Japan, prompting Universal Motown to release Liberation as a digital download only in October 2007. Next up in 2007, Mya co-starred in the independent romantic comedy film The Metrosexual, starring Shaun Benson in the title role. Screened at the Boston Film Festival, the movie received mixed reviews.

2008–2013: Sugar & Spice, Beauty & the Streets and K.I.S.S. (Keep It Sexy & Simple) 

In 2008, Mya co-starred in the Bill Duke-directed drama thriller film Cover in which she portrayed an AIDS victim named Cynda. The film dealt with the subject of men who are on the down-low in society and opened at selective theaters and grossed $79,436 in the United States. Her next film,  the direct-to-dvd romantic comedy film Love For Sale. Starring opposite Jackie Long and Jason Weaver, Mya played a college student named Kiely in a bad relationship. Following her departure from Universal Motown, Mya continued working on new material under her own independent imprint Planet 9 and contracted with Japanese R&B label Manhattan Records, a division of Lexington Group, to release new material. Her fifth studio album and first project for the label, Sugar & Spice, received a Japan-wide release in December 2008. Specifically recorded for the Asian music market, it was preceded by the single "Paradise" and spawned a reissue edition, released in 2009.

In 2009, Mya had a supporting role in the comedy drama indie film Bottleworld. It featured an ensemble cast of Anna Camp, Christopher Denham and Scott Wilson. Looking to release more new music, Mya signed a deal with Young Empire Music Group, and released her first mixtape called Beauty & The Streets Vol.1. It debuted and peaked at number 55 on Billboards US Top R&B/Hip-Hop Albums. In fall 2009, Mya appeared as a contestant on season nine of the ABC reality show Dancing with the Stars, partnered with professional dancer Dmitry Chaplin. One of the show's frontrunners throughout the entire competition, she danced on a sprained ankle for the last five weeks and ultimately placed second behind singer Donny Osmond. In 2010, Mya was invited to be a featured guest vocalist on the number-one hit remake "We Are the World 25 for Haiti". She appeared in The Penthouse, starring Rider Strong. The sex comedy earned largely negative reviews.

In early 2011, she appeared on French DJ and record producer Cedric Gervais's single "Love Is the Answer". Following the collaboration with Cedric Gervais, Mya released the solo single "Fabulous Life", which served as the first single from the Japanese version of her sixth studio album titled K.I.S.S. (Keep It Sexy & Simple), released in April 2011 in Japan. Production on the project was primarily handled by Cleveland native producer Young Yonny with additional contributions from Japanese musicians Jeff Miyahara and Daisuke Imai, Chuck Harmony and longtime collaborators Carvin & Ivan. As with Sugar & Spice, Mya took full creative control of the album and lent a hand in the songwriting process, co-writing and executive producing. The album debuted at number 72 on the Oricon Albums Chart. A US version of K.I.S.S. (Keep It Sexy & Simple), featuring several new recordings, was released in December 2011 via iTunes, with up-tempo track "Earthquake" featuring Trina serving as the album's lead single. It debuted and peaked at number 74 on the US Top R&B/Hip-Hop Albums.

2014–present: EP series, Smoove Jones, and T.K.O. (The Knock Out)
Starting in 2014, Mya released a series of EPs on her independent label Planet 9. With Love, a four-track Valentine's Day EP, was released in February 2014 to commemorate the release of her debut single "It's All About Me" and sixteenth anniversary in the entertainment industry. It received largely positive review from music critics. In April 2014, Mya starred opposite Linda Hamilton in the Syfy original TV movie Bermuda Tentacles, which garnered negative reviews. The same month, her second EP Sweet XVI was released to commemorate the release of her debut studio album Mya. It was followed by her second Valentine's Day EP, Love Elevation Suite, released in 2015.

Mya's seventh studio album Smoove Jones was released on February 14, 2016. It was preceded by the singles "Welcome to My World" and "Team You". Smoove Jones debuted at number 30 on Billboards Top R&B/Hip-Hop Albums chart on March 5, 2016. A critical success, it received a Grammy Award nomination for Best R&B Album at the 59th ceremony. In early September 2017, Mya announced the upcoming release of a new single entitled "Ready for Whatever", but gave no date for the release. "Ready for Whatever" was released September 22, 2017, as the first single from her forthcoming studio project. Less than two months later, Mya released "Ready, Part II" as the second single on November 25, 2017. On February 14, 2018, Mya released "You Got Me" as her third single from her forthcoming studio album TKO (The Knock Out) to commemorate the twentieth anniversary of her debut single "It's All About Me". Mya starred as Mina Kennedy in the UMCs original series drama 5th Ward The Series. It premiered March 2, 2018. She continued to release a slew of singles that included "Damage" and "Knock You Out". Her thirteenth studio project TKO (The Knock Out) was released April 20, 2018, commemorating the anniversary of her debut album Mya (1998).

A new single entitled, "G.M.O. (Got My Own)" featuring Tink was released on August 31, 2018. Mya co-starred in a new Vh1 reality television series, titled Girls Cruise with Lil' Kim and Chilli. It premiered July 15, 2019. In February 2019, Harrison released "With You" to honor the anniversary of her debut single. Approximately, two months later, "Down" was released to commemorate the one year anniversary of TKO (The Knock Out). The following month, Mya released "Open" on May 13, 2019. In June, she released the riddim collaboration "Handsfree" with dancehall artist Ding Dong. Harrison had announced a new single "Whine" was set to drop soon, however nothing ever materialize. In November 2019, Harrison collaborated with Canadian rapper Tory Lanez and was featured on his album Chixtape 5. In April 2020, Harrison released the single "You Got Me, Part II". A month later, the singer released "Space & Time" on May 29, 2020. Throughout the year, Mya continued to release a series of singles; the DJ Alyx Ander assisted EDM track "Without You", the midtempo cut, 
"I Deserve It", uptempo banger, "I'ma Do It", and heartfelt ballad, "Just Call My Name". The following year, she released dual singles, "Forever My Love" and "True Love" to coincide with her debut single anniversary. In February, she co-starred in the Tubi streaming platform action movie Lazarus. In July 2021, the singer released "Worth It" introducing her alter ego "Mya Lan$ky". In December, Mya starred in the Lifetime's original Christmas movie, My Favorite Christmas Melody alongside Rainbow Sun Francks. In January 2022, Mya made a guest appearance on the ABC reality show Shark Tank. In June 2022, Harrison reunited with Christina Aguilera for a special performance of "Lady Marmalade" at L.A. Pride.

In January 2023, Mya made a cameo in the rebooted comedy film House Party.

Artistry

Voice and songwriting

Mya possesses a mezzo-soprano vocal range that spans approximately four octaves with particularly the tonality and timbre of her voice being highlighted and described as "very special". Writing for Slate, Sasha Frere-Jones acknowledged although Harrison's breathy voice suggests smallness, she easily accommodates with up-to-date melisma, unadorned legato, and quiet crooning. Stephen Thomas Erlewine of AllMusic commented that Mya has a voice that is at once sounding "innocent and knowing", while consistently "upbeat and confident". Similarly, Billboard complimented her voice for having a "smooth, sensitive, angelic tone" to it who oozes with the confidence and stylistic flair of an artist twice her age.

Other music critics have referred to her voice as "weak" and "thin". In reviewing for her second studio album Fear of Flying, Jon Azpiri of AllMusic commented that "she is a promising young talent, but still has yet to develop the chops necessary to rank among the best of R&B divas." Rolling Stone wrote, "The signature quiver in Mya's voice does give her some sonic identity, but otherwise this could be the music of Destiny's Child, Aaliyah or any of the countless interchangeable hip-hop/R&B divas."

Since the beginning of her career, Mya has always been artistically involved in her career. Harrison writes the majority of her own material for her studio albums. In an interview, she explained she writes 99.9% of her albums, and when songs are submitted to her, if she feels the song is something that feels like something she can perform well and hits close to home, then she feels comfortable doing it. Harrison is known for writing sexually-driven lyrics and female empowerment compositions with a bit of an edge to them through her love for free-spirited word play. Mya's music typically "bridge the gap between" pop/R&B and "street-level" hip-hop. On her third album Moodring, she explored other genres such as techno and reggae.

In an interview with People, she revealed she draws her musical inspirations from humming a melody off the note of a whirring fan or tapping her foot to the rhythm of the bathtub dripping; commenting she can hear melodies from natural sounds like birds chirping or the taxis and construction in Manhattan. Occasionally, Harrison wishes she could stop the music. "In the middle of a conversation, I'll start humming or moving my feet, and my friends will say, 'You can't be serious, she notes. "It's such a reflex that I'm totally unaware I look like an idiot." Most of her songs are helmed from personal experiences in her life as well as friends' experiences.

Harrison has co-produced most of her records since 2000. She has her own recording studio and label imprint, Planet 9 and is heavily involved in the production of her music and every single process, from writing and recording to producing, mixing, and mastering her own projects. Harrison is very active in all aspects of her career from the actual production to the business; formulating the beat, creating the concept, and coming up with the melodies.

Stage
Mya has received praise for her stage presence and live performances. Author Stacy-Deanne opined that Harrison had developed into a well rounded-performer with flexible abilities who was consistently a "source of attraction" on television and on tour. Staff writer Trish Davis of Hartford Courant described her presence as "compelling" while noting, "With a voice that sends high notes with clarity and low ones with force, Mya's live act is solid." The AU Reviews Chris Singh lauded her showmanship, which he recognized has not "aged" nor her "dulcet notes" that stole the show, citing Mýa as "versatile" and a "tough act to follow". Similarly, Kelefa Sanneh of The New York Times praised her live performance, noting her dance movements in particular, which he described as "sprightly", "sexy" and "theatrical". Natasha Pinto of The Music commented, "She possesses the dreamiest falsetto and commands attention with every note and step she takes", acknowledging Mya's ability to perform with "absolute ease" and "sultry sass" who does not "miss a beat". Senior music writer George Palathingal for The Sydney Morning Herald noted, "whether performing slick routines alongside two booty-shaking dancers or accompanied only by an acoustic guitarist, Mya is all class."

Influences
Mya's musical influences include Sade Adu, Janet Jackson, Michael Jackson, Stevie Wonder, Aretha Franklin, Prince, Chaka Khan, Minnie Riperton, and Madonna. Mya praises Steve Wonder for his ability to hear music and play music and feel it and get other people to feel it, and Madonna for her boldness and courage. Mya calls Minnie Riperton her favorite female singer and Prince her musical hero, stating, "He's someone who takes risks. He's an all-around entertainer, hell of a performer. He's a genius."

Mya's dance influences include Gregory Hines, Michael Jackson, Janet Jackson, Savion Glover, Jimmy Slyde, Electric Boogaloos, Rock Steady Crew, Cyd Charisse, Gene Kelly, Fred Astaire and Sammy Davis Jr.

She cites Lena Horne and Liza Minnelli as her role models.

Alter ego
Introduced to audiences through her song, "Worth It", Mya credits notorious mob accountant Meyer Lansky for American Mafia, as inspiration for her new handle. The singer ties her low-key nature to his laid-back image and her independent artist status to his birthdate on the United States' Independence Day.

For Lan$ky's blunt cadence, Mya cites conscious and classic hip-hop trailblazers such as Mos Def, Common, Digable Planets, Black Thought, André 3000, and Erykah Badu.

However, all influences aside, Lan$ky is an integral part of Mya, relying on her specifically during hard times. "When I need a picker-upper, or somebody to be that mentor, someone to be that fighter, or somebody to be that person that will crack the whip and get me in shape, that's who Mýa Lan$ky is."

While adding, "The one that doesn't let me slip up. The one that's hard on me when I'm too vulnerable or hearing those voices, those outside forces. I get her together."

Other ventures
At the age of 18, Harrison served as an ad print spokeswoman for Bongo Jeans and had a Tommy Hilfiger lipstick shade named after her. In Fall 2000, she became a spokesperson for Iceberg jeans and featured in print ads in magazines. Harrison signed an endorsement deal with Coca-Cola in 2002, which included appearances on television commercials. She and then-label mate Common recorded a cover version of Ed Harris' "Real Compared To What". The commercial made its debut in 2003 at the American Music Awards and featured Mya in a 90-second commercial singing a jazzy cover version of the song alongside Chi-town rapper Common. In early 2003, Mya recorded an updated version of the Simon & Garfunkel classic hit "Feeling Groovy" for GAP television ads. The music for the spot was produced by Jimmy Jam & Terry Lewis. In late 2003, Mya performed the original theme song, "Everything or Nothing", for the then-latest video game in the Bond franchise007: Everything or Nothing. Mýa also appears in the game as the NSA agent sultry Bond girl "Mya Starling". Mya co-wrote and co-produced the song with Randy Bugnitz and A&M president Ron Fair, and three variations of the theme appeared in the game. In 2005, Motorola signed Mya and eight other artists to appear in a television commercial promoting its first iPod music phone, the Motorola rokr. The commercial starred Madonna and Iggy Pop alongside Little Richard, Bootsy Collins, Amerie, Alanis Morissette and look-alikes of Beethoven, Jimi Hendrix, and The Notorious B.I.G. Additionally in 2005, Mya signed to Ford Modeling agency and appeared in a variety of ad campaigns. On March 1, 2010, Escada announced that Mya would host the celebration to introduce their newest scent, Marine Groove, on March 13 in Miami Beach.

Personal life
She is a vegan (previously a longtime vegetarian) and has promoted the vegan lifestyle on PETA's behalf.

Philanthropy
In 2005, Mya created her own nonprofit organization, The Mya Arts & Tech Foundation, which is dedicated to "providing disadvantaged youth growth and opportunity through arts and technology education". In 2007, she was featured in Heatherette's Fashion Show for Lifeball in Vienna, Austria to fight against Global AIDS. Mya has hosted fundraisers for Skool'd to aid homeless LGBT youth, while also advocating for gay rights by opening the Out 100 Awards. In 2009, she continued her philanthropic efforts by chairing the 2009 Operation Smile Event, participating in the literary project, If I'd Known Then: Women in Their 20s and 30s Write Letters to their Younger Selves, by Ellen Spraggins, and accepting an honoree award for her work with the NSAL. In 2010 she was apart of various PSA campaigns including, Cyndi Lauper's True Colors: Give A Damn, NOH8 , and NSAL 2010. Most recently, Mya collaborated with singer Dionne Warwick on the gospel song "Let There Be Light". It featured a supergroup of Gladys Knight, Billy Ray Cyrus, Joe Don Rooney (Rascal Flatts), Kevin Sorbo, John Elefante (former lead singer of Kansas), Damon Elliott, The Sorbo Family, Yoni Gordon and Lucas Vidal. Released October 18, 2017, all of the song's proceeds were donated to non-profit organization Feeding America. In March 2022, Mya became World Animal Protection's first U.S. celebrity ambassador.

Legacy and influence
Vogues Alex Frank credits Mya as an influence of Y2K R&B. Writing for Vogue, Frank alludes that R&B stars Tinashe, FKA twigs, and Jhené Aiko "echoed a familiar kind of sound"; the sultry, futuristic music of R&B/pop singer Mya. He acknowledged Mya's capabilities to "elbowed out the crunchy catchiness of Britney Spears and aggression of Kid Rock" with interesting, seductive music and dubbed Harrison's brand of R&B as neo-R&B—an innovative take on a beloved genre that promised a way forward. Essentially, he observed, "with the dominant sounds of R&B production at the time", Mya was capable of "creating something preppy and poppy and radio-friendly that kept pace with the Britneys and the N'Syncs without sacrificing experimentation." While he accepted the three women currently dominating the genre, Tinashe, Jhené Aiko, and FKA twigs, "have been endlessly likened" to Aaliyah. He interjects noting, "you can hear [Mya] in their cross-generational appreciation of subtle, almost anti-pop that still places a premium on powerfully catchy choruses and light, airy vocals." Elaborating, "You can see it in their nose rings and crop tops." Thus, Frank concluded with "though Harrison's career didn't last, it's clear that her influence has." Lewis Dene of BBC Music applauded Mya's ability to continue to "shrewdly bridge the gap between pop/R&B and street-level hip hop." The Daily Beasts Stereo Williams recognized Mya as a trailblazer for artists like Tinashe and Kehlani while concluding her legacy is one that warrants celebrating. Music website Idolator epitomized "Case of the Ex (Whatcha Gonna Do)" as "everything that was great about turn-of-the millennium R&B". 
The Washington Post identifies Mya as a classic "triple threat", commenting, "now having acted in such films as Havana Nights and Chicago and proved, under Savion Glovers aegis, she's a formidable dancer." However, noted "Myas strongest trump card, overall, is charisma, one that mixing sweet, innocent girl next door and feisty hip-hop princess down the block." Mya has been credited as an influence or inspiration by Melissa Steel, Liz, Ari Lennox, Ray BLK, Natasha, D∆WN (dance), Normani, Jazzy Amra, Sir Babygirl, Princess Nokia, and Harloe.

Achievements

As of 2008, Harrison has sold over 7 million albums worldwide. In 2009, Billboard ranked Harrison at No. 97 on their list of Hot 100 Artists of the 2000s. Complex listed her at No. 33 on their list of Top 100 Hottest Female Singers of All Time. Harrison's breakthrough single "Case of the Ex (Whatcha Gonna Do)" was listed at No. 77 on Billboards Top 100 Songs by Female Solo Artists (1955-2007). Her collaborative effort, "Lady Marmalade" was listed at No. 47 on VH1's 100 Greatest Songs of '00s list.

Since Mya's arrival to the music industry, she has received numerous accolades, recognition(s), and honors throughout her career. In 2002, Harrison won a Grammy for Best Pop Collaboration with Vocals for "Lady Marmalade".  Harrison won a Screen Actors Guild Award for her participation in Chicago. She is the winner of two MTV moonmen including the prestigious Video of the Year award for Lady Marmalade. In 2006, Harrison was honored at the Palm Beach International Film Festival with the Cross Over Award (from singer to actor). Her singles "The Best of Me Pt. II" and "Ghetto Supastar (That Is What You Are)" were featured on About.com's Top 50 R&B/Hip Hop Collaborations list at 40 and 44 respectively.  In 2003 and 2004, she appeared on Maxim's Hot 100 list; ranking at 31 and 52 respectively. "Movin' On" was voted as one of The 50 Best R&B Videos of the 90s by Complex. Billboard ranked "Movin' On" tenth on their 20 Best High School Music Video list. Her performance of Lady Marmalade at the 44th Grammy Awards was featured on About.coms Top 10 Grammy Award Performances of All Time. In 2014, "Lady Marmalade" was featured on the Huffington Posts Top 10 Most Iconic Grammys Performances. In 2015, MTV voted Lady Marmalade at No. 1 as the Best Musical Performance in MTV Movie Award history. Harrison was featured on the Huffington Posts Top 26 Black Female Choreographer and Dancers list. Out magazine included "Case of the Ex" as one of their most empowering, memorable and influential all-girl dance routines.
Most recently, her eight independent project, Smoove Jones received a grammy nomination for Best R&B Album for the 59th Annual Grammy Awards.
Billboard listed "Lady Marmalade" on their 100 Greatest Award Show Performances of All Time list.

Discography

Studio albums
 Mya (1998)
 Fear of Flying (2000)
 Moodring (2003)
 Liberation (2007)
 Sugar & Spice (2008)
 K.I.S.S. (Keep It Sexy & Simple) (2011)
 Smoove Jones (2016)
 T.K.O. (The Knock Out) (2018)

Tours
Headlining
2001: Fear of Flying Tour
2003: Moodring Tour
2016: Smoove Jones Show
2018: T.K.O. Tour

Co-headlining
2007: Seagram's Live 
2016: 3 R&B Superstars: Live in Concert 

Opening act
1998: Evolution Tour 
2014: Full Frequency Tour 

Featured act
1998: Smokin' Groove Tour
1999: Lilith Fair
2000: All That! Music and More Festival
2007: BET Black College Tour 
2016: RNB Fridays Live
2019: Femme It Forward
2020: KISSTORY Presents...The Blast Off! Tour

Filmography

Film

Television

Video games

See also
List of artists who reached number one in the United States
List of artists who reached number one on the Australian singles chart

References

External links

 
 
 
 
 

 
1979 births
Living people
20th-century American actresses
20th-century American singers
20th-century American women singers
21st-century American actresses
21st-century American singers
21st-century American women singers
Activists from Maryland
Activists from Washington, D.C.
Actresses from Maryland
Actresses from Washington, D.C.
African-American activists
African-American actresses
African-American choreographers
African-American female dancers
African-American pianists
African-American record producers
African-American women singers
African-American women singer-songwriters
American choreographers
American contemporary R&B singers
American female dancers
American film actresses
American mezzo-sopranos
American music industry executives
American musical theatre actresses
American philanthropists
American stage actresses
American tap dancers
American television actresses
American women choreographers
American women philanthropists
American women pianists
American women pop singers
American women record producers
American women singer-songwriters
Dancers from Maryland
Dancers from Washington, D.C.
Grammy Award winners
Interscope Records artists
American LGBT rights activists
Motown artists
Outstanding Performance by a Cast in a Motion Picture Screen Actors Guild Award winners
Participants in American reality television series
People from Greenbelt, Maryland
People from Prince George's County, Maryland
Philanthropists from Maryland
Philanthropists from Washington, D.C.
Record producers from Maryland
Record producers from Washington, D.C.
Singer-songwriters from Maryland
Singer-songwriters from Washington, D.C.
Universal Motown Records artists
University of Maryland, College Park alumni